Blackout(s), black out, or The Blackout may refer to:

Loss of lighting or communication
 Power outage, a loss of electric power
 Blackout (broadcasting), a regulatory or contractual ban on the broadcasting of an event
 Blackout (fabric), a textile material that blocks light
 Blackout (wartime), the practice of minimizing outdoor lighting for protection from attack
 Communications blackout, a halt to communication abilities or utilization
 Media blackout, censorship of news related to a certain topic
 Protests against SOPA and PIPA, the 2012 web blackout

Medicine
 Blackout (drug-related amnesia), loss of memory with medicines or alcoholic beverages
 Blackout or lost time, a common symptom of psychogenic amnesia and dissociative identity disorder
 Syncope (medicine), a loss of consciousness, also known as fainting
 Freediving blackout, a loss of consciousness caused by cerebral hypoxia towards the end of a breath-hold dive
 Transient global amnesia, a temporary inability to establish new memories with otherwise unimpaired cognitive functions
 Blacking out also known as falling-out, a culture-bound syndrome

Arts and entertainment

Novels
 Blackout (Buffy novel), a 2006 novel based on the television series Buffy the Vampire Slayer
 Blackout (Connie Willis novel), first of a two-part series
 Blackout (Grant novel), third novel of a series by Mira Grant
 Blackout (Elsberg novel), a 2012 disaster thriller by Marc Elsberg
 Blackout (picture book), a 2011 children's novel by John Rocco
 Blackout (young adult novel), a 2021 young adult novel by Dhonielle Clayton, Tiffany D. Jackson, Nic Stone, Angie Thomas, Ashley Woodfolk, and Nicola Yoon
 Black Out (novel), a 2008 novel by Lisa Unger
 Blackout, a novel by Campbell Armstrong

Films
 Blackout, American title of Contraband, a British wartime spy film starring Conrad Veidt and Valerie Hobson
 Blackout (1942 film), a 1942 Bollywood film
 Blackout (1950 film), a British film
 Murder by Proxy, a 1954 film also known as Blackout
 Black Out (1970 film), a Swiss film
 Blackout (1985 film), an American television film starring Keith Carradine
 Blackout (1986 film), a Norwegian film directed by Erik Gustavson and starring Henrik Scheele
 Blackout (1988 film), an American  thriller film starring Gail O'Grady
 The Blackout (1997 film), an American film directed by Abel Ferrara
 Black Out p.s. Red Out, a 1998 Greek film
 Blackout (2007 film), an American television film starring Jeffrey Wright and Zoe Saldana set during the Northeast Blackout of 2003
 Blackout (2008 American film), a horror film starring Amber Tamblyn and Aidan Gillen
 Blackout (2008 Finnish film), a Finnish film
 The Blackout (2009 film), an American horror film
 Blackout (2010 film), a German television action film
 Black Out (2012 film), a Dutch crime action comedy
 Blade Runner Black Out 2022, a 2017 short film set in the Blade Runner universe
 The Blackout (2019 film), a Russian science fiction thriller film
 Blackout (2021 film), a Nigerian drama
 Blackout (2022 film), an American action thriller film

Television
Series
 Blackout (Australian TV series), a 1989–1995 ABC TV series by and about Indigenous Australians
 Blackout (game show), a 1988 American game show
 Blackout (TV series), a 2012 BBC One drama miniseries
Episodes
 "Blackout", a 2015 episode of the American Experience series on PBS
 "The Blackout", a 2000 episode of Black Books
 "Blackout" (Bugs), an episode of the BBC series Bugs
 "The Blackout" (Chowder episode), a 2009 episode of Chowder
 "Blackout" (Lego Ninjago: Masters of Spinjitzu), an episode of Lego Ninjago: Masters of Spinjitzu
 "Blackout" (M.A.S.K. episode), a 1985 episode of M.A.S.K.
 "Blackout!", an episode of season 3 of Phineas and Ferb
 "Blackout!" (Ugly Betty), an episode of the American series Ugly Betty
 "Black Out" (American Horror Story), an episode of the eleventh season of American Horror Story
 "Black Out" (The Professionals), an episode of the crime-action drama series

Music

Bands and record labels
 Blackout Records, a record label
 The Blackout (band), a Welsh alternative rock band
 The Blackouts, a Seattle post-punk band
 Blackout (musician), American record producer, engineer and composer

Albums
 Black Out (The Good Life album), 2002
 Blackout (Britney Spears album), 2007
 Blackout (Dominion album)
 Blackout (Dropkick Murphys album), 2003
 Blackout (Steffany Gretzinger album), 2018
 Blackout (Hed PE album)
 Blackout (Scorpions album), 1982
 Blackout (The Brilliant Green album), 2010
 Blackout (Affiance album)
 Blackout (Audrey Horne album), 2018
 Blackout! (Method Man & Redman album)
 Blackouts (Ashra album), a 1978 album by Manuel Göttsching, originally released by the band Ashra
 The Blackout (album), a 2008 album by Derek Minor
 Blaque Out, a 2001 album by Blaque
Black Out (Woo Won-jae album), 2020

Songs
 "Blackout" (Bonnie Anderson song), 2014
 "Blackout" (David Bowie song), 1977
 "Blackout" (Breathe Carolina song), 2011
 "Blackout" (Linkin Park song), 2010
 "Blackout" (Wretch 32 song), 2013
 "Blackout", by Allister on the albums Before the Blackout and 20 Years and Counting
 "Blackout", by Asian Kung-Fu Generation on the album Fanclub
 "Blackout", by Attila on the album Villain
 "Blackout", by British Sea Power on the album The Decline of British Sea Power
 "Blackout", by Garbage on the album Strange Little Birds
 "Blackout", by Lupe Fiasco on the album Lupe Fiasco's The Cool
 "Blackout", by Funkoars on the album The Greatest Hits
 "Blackout", by Heatmiser on the album Dead Air
 "Blackout", by Hybrid on the album Morning Sci-Fi
 "Blackout", in the musical In the Heights
 "Blackout", by Lovedrug on the album Pretend You're Alive
 "Blackout", by Mashonda from her debut Japan only album January Joy
 "Blackout", by Heidi Montag on the album Superficial
 "Blackout", by Muse on the album Absolution
 "Blackout", by Parkway Drive on the album Killing with a Smile
 "Blackout", by Pepper on the album Pink Crustaceans and Good Vibrations
 "Blackout", by Scorpions on the album Blackout
 "Blackout", by Senses Fail on the album Life Is Not a Waiting Room
 "Blackout", by Stratovarius on the album Destiny
 "Blackout", by The Whip on the album X Marks Destination
 "Blackout", by Unsraw from the EP Calling
 "The Blackout", by Like Moths to Flames from the album An Eye for an Eye
 "The Blackout", by U2 from the album Songs of Experience
 "The Blackout! The Blackout! The Blackout!", debut EP by the band Blackout

Comics
 Blackout (Marcus Daniels), the first character with the name in the Marvel Universe
 Blackout (Lilin), the second character with the name in the  Marvel Universe
 Blackout (Farooq), a minor character in the DC Universe

Other uses in arts and entertainment
 Blackout (podcast), a suspense/thriller podcast starring and produced by Rami Malek
 Blackout gag, a comedy technique used primarily in animation
 Blackout, a common feature of midnight ghost shows
 Blackout (horror experience), an immersive horror experience derived from haunted house attractions
 Blackout convention, a bidding convention in contract bridge
 Blackout (card game), a British variant of the card game, Oh Hell
 Blackout, a downloadable Halo 3 map that is part of the Legendary Map Pack
 The Blackout (professional wrestling), a wrestling stable
 Blackout, a battle royale game mode in Call of Duty: Black Ops 4
 Blackout, a robot super villain character in the Transformers film series

See also
 Blackout Day, a digital social campaign occurring on a seasonal basis
 Blackout cake (sometimes Brooklyn Blackout cake), a chocolate cake
 Blackout tattoo, a type of tattoo that involves tattooing an area of the body completely black.
 .300 AAC Blackout, a rifle cartridge